Podlužany is a village in north-western Slovakia.

Geography
Podlužany is located approximately 7 km north from Bánovce nad Bebravou and it constitutes the entrance gate into the micro-region Podhorie. The small river Bebrava flows past the west side of the village. It is surrounded by forests, fields and meadows scattered on nearby hills. There are five nature reservation around: Kňaží stôl (free transl: The Priest's Table), Ľutovský Drieňovec, Smradľavý vrch (free transl: Stinking Mountain), Udrina, Žrebíky; two nature landmarks: Stará Bebrava stream and Dúpna diera cave.

Tourism
For its scenic beauty Podlužany, nearby villages and surrounding landscape is often sought out by hikers. In the village starts green marked trail that leads to trail junction in Trebichavské sedlo ridge past the mysterious tree Rakoczi Oak upon which a legend hovers which says that the leader of uprising against Habsburgs, Francis II Rákóczi took a rest in the end of 17th century.

References

External links

 Official page
http://www.statistics.sk/mosmis/eng/run.html

Villages and municipalities in Bánovce nad Bebravou District